CVRR may refer to:

Cimarron Valley Railroad
Cumberland Valley Railroad